"She's Funny That Way" or "He's Funny That Way" is a popular song, composed by Neil Moret, with lyrics by Richard Whiting. It was composed for the short film Gems of MGM in 1929 for Marion Harris, but the film was not released until 1931. Harris sang it as "I'm Funny That Way". 

A torch song, according to Philip Furia and Michael Lasser, the "song begins self-deprecatingly—'I'm not much to look at, I'm nothing to see'—but "at the end of each chorus, it affirms the lover's good fortune: 'I've got a woman crazy 'bout me, she's funny that way. They state that it is unusual as the song was written from a man's point of view, whereas most torch songs are written from the female perspective about a man who betrayed or abused the woman.

Ted Lewis's recording was popular in 1929. The song has generally been more covered by female artists as "He's Funny That Way". Thelma Carpenter recorded it in the 1930s at the age of 19, "handling the vocal like a seasoned veteran" according to  Dave Oliphant, but it is most associated with Billie Holiday, who first recorded it in 1937. Holiday later featured it on her 1953 album An Evening with Billie Holiday.

References

1929 songs
1920s jazz standards
Billie Holiday songs
Torch songs